The Amycos Satyrykos is a fragmentary satyr play by the fifth-century BCE Athenian dramatist Sophocles.

Content 
This satyr play almost certainly told the story of the Argonauts and their encounter with Amycus, an inhospitable king in Bithynia, who would challenge travellers to a boxing match before allowing them to draw water for their ships, and invariably killed his opponents. However, upon landing, Polydeuces promptly challenged and defeated the king, and depending on the author, the Argonaut then either killed Amycos  or made him swear an oath on his life that he would no longer “maltreat strangers”. Jebb believes another ending, which was related by Periander, wherein Amycos was put in chains, would have been more suitable for a satyr play; unfortunately, it is impossible to say for certain which of these endings was used by Sophocles

Date 
Unfortunately, no date more precise than the 5th century BCE can as yet be reliably ascribed to the writing or production of the play.

Extant Sources 
Fragments of the Amycos by Sophocles are only found in Athenaeus, Deipnosophists 9, 400B

References

 Jebb, Richard C. et al. (2010) The Fragments of Sophocles, Vol. 1 Cambridge University Press 
 Lloyd-Jones, Hugh (1996) Sophocles Fragments, Vol. 3 Loeb Classical library 
 Apollonius of Rhodes 2, 1-97
 Theocritus 22, 27-134
 Schol. Apollonius Rhodos 2. 98

Plays by Sophocles
Satyr plays
Lost plays